The Lavington Panthers Football & Netball Club is an Australian rules football and netball club and was formed in 1918 and currently competes in the Ovens & Murray Football League.

The club is based in Lavington, a suburb of Albury, New South Wales.

Several Lavington footballers have gone on to play in the Australian Football League, including Darren Holmes, Hamish McIntosh, Allan Murray, Derek Murray and Mark Powell.

League honours: Football

Albury & Border Football Association (1921–1927) 
 Senior premierships (2): 
 1922 (Div.2), 1924

Central Hume Football Association (1928–1932) 
 (No listed honours)

HFL/Hume Football League (1933–1939) 
 Senior premierships (1): 1938
 Senior runners-up (2): 1934, 1939
 Senior HFL Best & Fairest winners (1): 1934 - Harold McIntosh

Albury & Border Football Association (1945) 
 Finished 5th of six in 1945 3 wins, 6 losses, 1 draw

Chiltern & District Football Association (1946–1956) 
 Senior runners-up (2): 1955, 1956.
 Senior CDFL Best & Fairest winner - "Huggins Medal" (1): 1947 - Brian O'Shaughnessy

TDFL / Tallangatta & District Football League (1958–1976) 
 Senior premierships (3): 1965, 1966, 1971
 Senior runners-up (7): 1960, 1961, 1964, 1969, 1970, 1973, 1974
 Senior TDFL Best & Fairest winners (1): 1973 - Max Urquhart
 Senior TDFL Leading Goal Kickers (2): 1963 - Ray Thomas, 1976 - Russell Sawyer
 Reserves premierships (5): 1968, 1970, 1971, 1972, 1975
 Thirds premierships (3): 1974, 1975, 1976

HFL / Hume Football League (1975–1976) 
 (No listed honours)

Farrer Football League (1977–1978) 
 (No listed honours)

OMFL / Ovens & Murray Football League (1979–present) 
 Senior premierships (5): 1983, 1986, 2001, 2005, 2019
 Senior runners-up (10): 1982, 1985, 1987, 1988, 1990, 1996, 1998, 2008, 2015, 2016
 Senior OMFL Best & Fairest winners - "Morris Medal" (2): 1985 - Ralph Aalbers, 1987 - Richard Hamilton
 Senior OMFL Leading Goal Kickers - "Doug Strang Medal" (5): 1996 - Chris Stuhldrier, 1997 - Chris Stuhldrier, 1998 - Chris Stuhldrier, 1999 - Chris Stuhldrier, 2015 - Adam Prior
 Reserves premierships (2): 1982, 2015
 Thirds premierships (2): 1993, 2009

Honour boards: Football (1921–present)

References

External links

Official website
1938 - Hume FL Premiers: Lavington FC - team photo
1945 - Lavington FC - team photo

Ovens & Murray Football League clubs
1880s establishments in Australia
Sport in Albury, New South Wales
Netball teams in New South Wales
Australian rules football clubs in New South Wales